Jennison Machisti Myrie-Williams (born 17 May 1988) is an English footballer who plays as a winger.

Myrie-Williams began his career at Bristol City, progressing through the club's youth system before making his first-team debut in May 2006. He played regularly for Bristol City during the 2006–07 season as the club were promoted to the Championship. During the 2007–08 season, Myrie-Williams was loaned out to Cheltenham Town and Tranmere Rovers respectively in order to gain more first-team experience. The following season, he was loaned out to Cheltenham Town again, before having further loan spells at Carlisle United and Hereford United.

He was released by Bristol City in May 2009, and joined Scottish Premier League club Dundee United on a free transfer a month later. After a season at Dundee United, Myrie-Williams moved to St Johnstone on a free transfer, making five appearances, before leaving the club in January 2011. He joined League Two club Oxford United in the same month, but the deal collapsed due to the fact that the player had already played for two clubs during the 2010–11 campaign. In July 2011, Myrie-Williams signed for League One club Stevenage on a free transfer.

Myrie-Williams joined Port Vale on a six-week loan spell in November 2011, and following his release by Stevenage in May 2012, signed for the club on a permanent basis two months later. He helped Port Vale to secure promotion out of League Two during the 2012–13 season, and was also voted onto the PFA Team of the Year. He signed with Scunthorpe United in June 2014, and had a second spell on loan at Tranmere Rovers in January 2015. He joined Irish club Sligo Rovers in August 2015, and then signed for Newport County in June 2016. He signed with National League club Torquay United in September 2017, and then moved on to Hereford five months later. He helped Hereford to win the Southern League Premier Division title at the end of the 2017–18 season. Myrie-Williams left Hereford in October 2018 and spent the remainder of the 2018–19 season at National League South club Weston-super-Mare, before joining Gloucester City in June 2019. He rejoined Weston-super-Mare in March 2020 and signed with Chippenham Town in August 2021.

Early life
Born in Lambeth, south London, he always wanted to play professional football, and stated that he never considered any other career path. Myrie-Williams and his family moved to Bristol at the age of 14 in order to make it easier for him to play at Bristol City's academy.

Club career

Bristol City
Having progressed through the youth system at Bristol City, he made his first-team debut for the club on the last day of the 2005–06 season, coming on as a 61st-minute substitute in a 1–0 defeat at Southend United on 6 May 2006. Myrie-Williams made three substitute appearances at the start of Bristol City's 2006–07 campaign, before making his first starting appearance in a 1–0 home victory against Brighton & Hove Albion on 2 September 2006. He scored his first professional goal in a 3–1 home victory against Chesterfield on 16 September 2006, scoring with a chipped shot to give Bristol City a two-goal lead. Myrie-Williams made 35 appearances for the club during the 2006–07 season, scoring twice, as Bristol City earned automatic promotion to the Championship after finishing in second place.

Loan moves
Ahead of the 2007–08 season, Bristol City manager Gary Johnson stated his intention to send Myrie-Williams out on loan in order to gain first-team experience. Johnson believed that Myrie-Williams would only benefit from a loan move to a League One club, given that he was playing in the third tier of English football prior to Bristol City's promotion to the Championship during the 2006–07 campaign. Two days before the start of the 2007–08 season, Myrie-Williams joined Cheltenham Town on a month's loan. He made his debut for Cheltenham in the club's 1–0 home win against Gillingham on the first day of the season, coming on as a substitute in the 68th minute. After making four first-team appearances for Cheltenham during the month, Myrie-Williams' loan was extended for a further month, running until 6 October 2007. Cheltenham manager John Ward said "I am really pleased that Jennison will be staying with us. In the last two or three games he has started to show his tremendous pace and ability on the ball". His loan was extended again in October 2007, taking him into a third month with Cheltenham. He scored his first goal for Cheltenham in a 3–1 away win at Swindon Town in the Football League Trophy, scoring the first goal of the game, "finishing neatly after a superb through ball from Craig Reid". He made his final appearance for Cheltenham in a 2–2 home draw with Crewe Alexandra, coming on as a substitute as Cheltenham scored two late goals to salvage a point. After the match, Myrie-Williams suffered a knee injury in training, ruling him out of first-team action for two weeks. He made 13 appearances for Cheltenham during his three-month loan spell, scoring one goal and he returned to his parent club in early November 2007.

After his loan spell at Cheltenham, Myrie-Williams joined Tranmere Rovers, also of League One, on a one-month loan agreement. On bringing Myrie-Williams to the club, Tranmere manager Ronnie Moore stated "He is left footed and will bring balance to our side". He made his debut for Tranmere two days later, starting in the club's 1–0 home defeat to eventual champions Swansea City. His loan spell was extended for a further month on 19 December 2007, after Myrie-Williams had impressed manager Ronnie Moore during his four weeks with the club. Myrie-Williams scored his first goal for Tranmere on 26 January 2008, scoring the winning goal from the penalty spot in a 2–1 victory against Yeovil Town at Prenton Park. Two days after scoring his first goal for the club, his loan spell was extended until the end of the 2007–08 season. Both managers were "delighted" with the progress Myrie-Williams was making at Tranmere, with Bristol City manager Gary Johnson adding "Jennison's developing well at Tranmere and it would be criminal to bring him back now". He scored his second goal for Tranmere just five days later in a 2–0 away win at Leeds United; Myrie-Williams scored with an "angled shot" in the 61st-minute to give Tranmere their fourth consecutive victory. He scored his third goal of the campaign on 5 April 2008, with a header from Andrew Taylor's cross in the third minute to give Tranmere the lead away at Walsall. He was substituted after 55 minutes with an injury that ruled him out for the rest of the campaign. He returned to Bristol City, having scored three goals in 26 appearances for Tranmere.

At the start of the 2008–09 season, Myrie-Williams returned to Cheltenham Town, signing on a one-month loan deal on 14 August 2008. On bringing Myrie-Williams back to the club, Cheltenham manager Keith Downing said "Jennison is an exciting young player who will give us some different options. We've perhaps been lacking a bit of pace and he will give us that as well". He made his second debut for the club four days later, scoring with a header in the 80th-minute to ensure Cheltenham picked up their first victory of the 2008–09 season with a 2–0 win against Swindon Town. Myrie-Williams made five appearances for Cheltenham during his one-month loan spell, scoring one goal. He returned to Bristol City on 15 September 2008. Shortly after returning to his parent club, Myrie-Williams was loaned out to another League One club, this time in the form of Carlisle United. Myrie-Williams stated that the move appealed to him because of manager John Ward, who he had played under at Cheltenham Town. He made his Carlisle debut on 20 September 2008, coming on as a 72nd-minute substitute in a 2–0 home defeat to Leeds United. The loan agreement was extended for another month on 15 October 2008. Myrie-Williams was loaned out for a third time during the 2008–09 season, the fifth loan spell of his career, when he joined Hereford United in January 2009. He scored his first goal for Hereford on 17 February 2009 in the club's 2–0 home victory against Leeds United, scoring with a low shot to give Hereford the lead just before half-time. He returned to Bristol City after Hereford's 1–0 home loss against Peterborough United on 21 February 2009. A month later, Myrie-Williams rejoined Hereford until the end of the season. He made 15 appearances over the period of the two loan spells, scoring twice, as Hereford were relegated back to League Two after finishing bottom of the table.

Dundee United
At the end of the 2008–09 season, Myrie-Williams was released by Bristol City. He joined Dundee United on a free transfer on 12 June 2009, signing a two-year contract with the Scottish Premier League club. Myrie-Williams made his Dundee United debut on 22 August 2009, coming on as an 88th-minute substitute in a 0–0 draw at St Mirren. He made his first league start on 17 October 2009, playing 84 minutes in a 1–1 home draw against Hamilton Academical, earning the 'Man of the Match' award for his performance. He scored his first competitive goal for Dundee United in a 3–2 home win against St Mirren on 5 December 2009, scoring the club's third goal in the match. Myrie-Williams received the first red card of his career when he was sent-off for two bookable offences in the club's 2–0 home defeat against Celtic on 25 April 2010. He played in the club's 2–0 victory over Raith Rovers in the Scottish Cup semi-final, but was not selected for the Hampden Park final. He made 27 appearances in his first season at the club, scoring twice.

He remained at Dundee United ahead of the 2010–11 season, and made his first appearance of the season in a 1–1 draw with St Mirren on 14 August 2010, appearing as a substitute in the 74th-minute. It was to be Myrie-Williams' only appearance for the club at the start of the campaign, and four days later, on 18 August, Dundee United manager Peter Houston told the player he was available for transfer in order to cut the club's wage bill. Shortly before the summer transfer window closed, on 31 August 2010, Myrie-Williams left the club by mutual consent.

St Johnstone
Myrie-Williams signed for another Scottish Premier League club in the form of St Johnstone on 14 September 2010, joining on a free transfer. Signing for the club on a short-term deal lasting until January 2011, he made his debut for the club in St Johnstone's 2–1 home victory against St Mirren on 18 September 2010. After two appearances in two home defeats in quick succession against Celtic in late October 2010, Myrie-Williams did not feature again for two months. His last appearance for the club was as an 89th-minute substitute in the club's 2–0 away defeat against Celtic at Celtic Park on 26 December 2010. Shortly after the game, he was told by manager Derek McInnes that he was free to find a new club, with his contract expiring at the end of January 2011. Myrie-Williams made eight appearances for St Johnstone during his three-month spell at the club.

Shortly after leaving St Johnstone, Myrie-Williams opted for a move back to England, signing for League Two club Oxford United on 27 January 2011 for the rest of the 2010–11 campaign. However, the transfer collapsed as a result of Myrie-Williams having already played for two clubs during the 2010–11 season; playing one game for Dundee United and eight for St Johnstone. Under FIFA regulations, a player cannot play for more than two permanent clubs in a season. The English Football Association could not register Myrie-Williams as they are bound by FIFA regulations. Similarly, the English Football League could not register him to play for Oxford as his international clearance could not be granted.

Stevenage
Myrie-Williams signed for League One club Stevenage on a free transfer on 8 July 2011. He made his debut for Stevenage in the club's 3–1 away win against AFC Bournemouth on 16 August 2011, coming on as a 74th-minute substitute and helping to create Stevenage's third goal. After making four successive substitute appearances, Myrie-Williams started his first match for the club on 24 September, playing 45 minutes in a 1–0 defeat to Carlisle United at Brunton Park.

Myrie-Williams joined League Two club Port Vale on loan on 24 November 2011, joining on an agreement until January 2012. A day later, he made his debut for Port Vale in a 0–0 home draw against Torquay United, playing the whole match. During the game, he impressed manager Micky Adams — "He (Myrie-Williams) lifted me, as I'm asking people to be positive and show character, because the fans are disappointed with the way things have gone recently, and we need to give them something to shout about, which I believe he did. I thought he was outstanding, he looked exciting on the ball and he got crosses into the box". In his next appearance for the club, he scored the equalising goal in a 2–1 win at Dagenham & Redbridge, when he "blasted in" a "25-yard blockbuster" – fellow Stevenage loanee Madjo went on to score the winning goal. Myrie-Williams' effort was Vale's first goal in 502 minutes (more than five games) of football. He returned to Broadhall Way in January having scored one goal in six games for Port Vale, who were unable to extend the loan deal due to an acute lack of funds.

On his return to Stevenage, Myrie-Williams was made available for transfer by manager Graham Westley, and was told he did not feature in Westley's plans. Both Port Vale and Sheffield United were reportedly interested in signing the player on a permanent basis. League Two club Bradford City also spoke to Stevenage with a view to bringing in Myrie-Williams, although "the chase was put on hold" following Westley's departure — with new manager Gary Smith wishing to evaluate the squad. No transfer materialised, and he came on as a late substitute in Stevenage's 2–0 defeat to Charlton Athletic on 25 February 2012, marking his first appearance for Stevenage in five months. Myrie-Williams made 19 appearances for Stevenage in all competitions during the campaign. Despite an increase in first-team involvement under Smith, he was released by Stevenage when his contract expired in May 2012.

Port Vale

Myrie-Williams joined Port Vale on a free transfer on 2 July 2012, signing a two-year contract after having impressed during his brief loan spell at the club during the 2011–12 season. He hit the ground running at Vale Park, and put in a particularly strong performance against League One leaders Tranmere Rovers in the League Trophy First Round, as he "tormented" full-back Zoumana Bakayogo, and claimed both goals of a 2–0 win with a penalty and a 30-yard free-kick he described as "up there with the best goals I've scored". He was named in the League Two team of the week after converting from the penalty spot in a 3–1 win at Aldershot Town on 26 November. As the 2012–13 season drew to a close, League Two managers voted him the fifth best player of the season at the annual Football League Awards. Vale secured promotion with a third-place finish at the end of the season, and Myrie-Williams finished with nine assists and 11 goals in 50 games. He was voted onto the PFA Team of the Year, alongside teammate Tom Pope.

He lost his first-team place in mid-October of the 2013–14 season after Adams changed system, before he marked his return to the starting line-up with a brace against Shortwood United in the FA Cup. He ended the campaign with ten goals in 45 appearances, helping the club to secure a ninth-place finish in League One. After a public vote held in February 2020, he was named by The Sentinel as Port Vale's second-best winger of the 2010s with 32% of the vote, behind David Worrall (44%).

Scunthorpe United
Myrie-Williams rejected a contract with Port Vale to sign a two-year deal with newly promoted League One club Scunthorpe United on 11 June 2014. He went on loan to League Two club Tranmere Rovers in January 2015, after being signed by his former Port Vale manager Micky Adams. Tranmere were relegated out of the Football League at the end of the 2014–15 season, and Myrie-Williams became a free agent in the summer after his contract with Scunthorpe was cancelled by mutual consent.

Sligo Rovers
He had trials with Bristol Rovers and Yeovil Town in summer 2015. At the end of the month, he signed with League of Ireland Premier Division club Sligo Rovers, managed by Adams, who had also signed Myrie-Williams during his time as manager at Port Vale and Tranmere.

Newport County
Myrie-Williams signed a one-year contract with League Two club Newport County on 16 June 2016. He made his debut for Newport on 6 August 2016 in a 3–2 defeat to Mansfield Town at Rodney Parade. He scored his first competitive goal for Newport ten days later in a 2–1 defeat at Luton Town. He impressed manager Graham Westley after he was "concentrated and focused, determined and resilient in defence" filling in at left-back in December 2016. He left Newport after he turned down the offer of a new contract in July 2017.

Later career
Myrie-Williams joined National League club Torquay United on non-contract terms on 15 September 2017, arriving two days after the appointment of head coach Gary Owers. He made 10 league appearances for Torquay across the 2017–18 season, of which three were starting appearances, before he left Plainmoor on 12 February 2018.

He joined Southern League Premier Division club Hereford 11 days later; Hereford manager Peter Beadle said that "it's great to have someone of the calibre of Jennison". He scored on his Hereford debut on 24 February, to help his new club to record a 2–0 victory over Weymouth at Edgar Street. The goal was named as the club's Goal of the Season. He scored a hat-trick during a 5–1 victory over Gosport Borough on 24 March 2018. He helped Hereford to win the league title at the end of the 2017–18 season. Myrie-Williams left the club on 5 October 2018 after being limited to six National League North appearances at the start of the 2018–19 season. Myrie-Williams joined National League South club Weston-super-Mare on 16 November 2018. He scored two goals in 18 appearances as the Weston-super-Mare were relegated at the end of the 2018–19 season.

Myrie-Williams signed with National League North club Gloucester City on 11 June 2019, following former Weston-Super-Mare teammate Marlon Jackson; upon signing the duo, manager Mike Cook commented that "this has been a long drawn out process and we are delighted to secure their quality and experience". He was released by Gloucester in January after nine league appearances. He rejoined Weston-super-Mare, now in the Southern League Premier Division South, in March 2020. Due to the COVID-19 pandemic in England, the 2019–20 Southern Football League season was formally abandoned on 26 March 2020, with all results from the season being expunged.

Myrie-Williams signed with Chippenham Town of the National League South on 19 August 2021, making two brief substitute appearances during the 2021–22 season.

International career
Myrie-Williams has represented England at under-18 level.

Style of play
Myrie-Williams is generally deployed as a winger, and can play on either flank. He is predominantly left-footed, and has been used on the wing for the majority of his career. Despite being left-footed, Myrie-Williams states that he is much more comfortable on the right wing — cutting inside and getting a shot on goal. He has been described as being "blessed with searing pace and an impressive left foot", causing defenders "countless problems". Myrie-Williams believes that his strongest attribute is that he "loves running at defenders", as well as being "pretty confident with the ball at his feet" and "not being afraid to take anyone on due to his pace". He also states that he can "spot a good pass", and gets as much enjoyment assisting goals as he does scoring them. He has been described as a "direct winger" with "a habit of drifting out wide". Myrie-Williams often takes set-pieces and has been described as a "dangerous crosser of the ball".

In June 2009, former footballer turned pundit Steve Claridge stated that Myrie-Williams was "an exciting prospect" due to his style of play. He also claimed Myrie-Williams was a "priceless asset" in terms of turning defence into attack and relieving defensive pressure — "Whenever he was given time and space to run at the opposition he looked dangerous and comfortable with the ball at his feet. This appears to be a side to his game that comes naturally. As the match became stretched he quickly turned defence into attack with lung-bursting 50-yard runs". Claridge did, however, believe that Myrie-Williams often tried to complicate matters too much and needed to work on "simplifying his game" in order to be able to "assess the situation" better.

Myrie-Williams believes that he needs to work on his heading ability, and despite actively trying to improve it, he states that it still "needs a bit of work". He also states that managers often tell him he needs to track back more and do more defensive work in matches — in-turn offering more protection to the full back.

Personal life
He states that the biggest influence in his life is his mother, as well as saying that former Bristol City manager Gary Johnson "really looked after him" during his time at the club. He supports Manchester United, and "loves watching the way they play", in particular the club's treble winning team during the 1998–99 campaign. He has a daughter, born in 2011.

Career statistics

Honours
Bristol City
League One second-place promotion: 2006–07

Dundee United
Scottish Cup: 2009–10

Port Vale
League Two second-place promotion: 2012–13

Hereford
Southern Football League Premier Division: 2017–18

Individual
PFA Team of the Year: 2012–13 League Two

References

External links

1988 births
Footballers from Lambeth
Living people
Association football forwards
English footballers
Black British sportspeople
Bristol City F.C. players
Cheltenham Town F.C. players
Tranmere Rovers F.C. players
Carlisle United F.C. players
Hereford United F.C. players
Dundee United F.C. players
St Johnstone F.C. players
Stevenage F.C. players
Port Vale F.C. players
Scunthorpe United F.C. players
Sligo Rovers F.C. players
Newport County A.F.C. players
Torquay United F.C. players
Hereford F.C. players
Weston-super-Mare A.F.C. players
Gloucester City A.F.C. players
Chippenham Town F.C. players
English Football League players
Scottish Premier League players
League of Ireland players
National League (English football) players
Southern Football League players